Ahona Rahman is a Bangladeshi actress and model, who came to the media participating in the photo contest show Binodon Bichitra Photogenic Contest held in 2006. She also appeared in Bengali film.

Early life and background
Ahona's nickname is Lucky.

Career
Ahona started her career with modeling then she made her debut in Bengali drama Choita Pagla. In 2008, she made her acting debut in the Bengali film industry with the film Chakorer Prem, with co-star Amin Khan. She also appeared in Dui Prithibi with co-actor Shakib Khan.

Filmography

Television

Web series

References

External links

 
 

Year of birth missing (living people)
Place of birth missing (living people)
Living people
Bangladeshi film actresses
People from Patuakhali district